The South Wales Trunk Road Agent (SWTRA) is one of the two trunk road agents in Wales. It is responsible for managing motorways and trunk roads in South Wales on behalf of the Welsh Government. Established on 1 April 2006 as the South Wales Trunk Road Agency, and renamed to its current name on 1 April 2012. The agent manages the motorways and trunk roads in the fourteen principal areas of the south of Wales, from the Severn Bridge in the east to Milford Haven in the west. The remainder of Wales is managed by the North and Mid Wales Trunk Road Agent.

History

Prior to the South Wales Trunk Road Agency being established, motorways and trunk roads in Wales were managed by the Ministry of Transport, later being taken on by the Welsh Office. The National Assembly for Wales took responsibility for devolved powers on 1 July 1999, as part of this process, transport was transferred from the Parliament of the United Kingdom to the National Assembly for Wales and with it responsibility for the trunk road network, including motorways. Responsibility for the management of highways in Wales is split between the Welsh Government and local highway agencies. The Welsh Government is responsible for trunk roads and motorways, whilst the 22 local authorities are responsible for all other highways.

In 2001 the Welsh Government reviewed the way in which trunk roads and motorways were being managed, and by September 2004, they had decided to reduce the number of trunk road agencies from eight down to three. The three new agencies including the South Wales Trunk Road Agency (SWTRA), which was later renamed the South Wales Trunk Road Agent.

The South Wales Trunk Road Agency (SWTRA) acts as Agent Highway Authority for the Welsh Government

Neath Port Talbot County Borough Council manage and maintains the trunk road network on behalf of the Transport and Strategic Regeneration division of the Welsh Government for SWTRA.

Roads managed

See also
Trunk roads in Wales
Highways in England and Wales
Trunk road
Trunk road agent
North and Mid Wales Trunk Road Agent
Roads in the United Kingdom
List of motorways in the United Kingdom
Welsh Government Traffic Officer

References

External links
Official website

Road transport in Wales
Welsh executive agencies